Liisa Anttila (born 30 September 1974) is a Finnish orienteering and ski-orienteering champion.

Orienteering
Anttila won a gold medal in the relay event at the 2001 World Orienteering Championships in Tampere with the Finnish team. She became Junior World Orienteering Champion in the classic distance in 1993.

Ski orienteering
Anttila has won four gold medals, four silver medals and four bronze medals at the World Ski Orienteering Championships, from 1998 to 2007. She also has three gold medals at the Junior World Ski Orienteering Championships

See also
 Finnish orienteers
 List of orienteers
 List of orienteering events

References

External links

1974 births
Living people
Finnish orienteers
Female orienteers
Foot orienteers
Ski-orienteers
World Orienteering Championships medalists
Competitors at the 2001 World Games
Junior World Orienteering Championships medalists